Fear Factor is an American stunt/dare game show that pitted contestants against one another in a series of extreme physical and mental challenges. The series originally aired on NBC for six seasons from 2001 to 2006 and was briefly revived for a seventh season in 2011–12. All seven seasons of the NBC series were hosted by Joe Rogan. A rebooted version of Fear Factor hosted by Ludacris aired for two seasons on MTV from 2017 to 2018.

The show's regular format featured six individual contestants (three men and three women) or four teams of two people competing in three extreme stunts for a grand prize of $50,000. The individual contestant format was the default for seasons 1–4, and season 5 contained a mix of individual and team episodes. The show permanently switched to the teams format in season 6, and this became the default format for the rest of the series, including the MTV reboot.

Series overview

NBC episodes

Season 1 (2001)

Season 2 (2001–02)

Season 3 (2002–03)
Although most episodes of the third season of Fear Factor were played in the regular format, this season introduced several special episode formats that would recur in subsequent seasons. Most notably, season 3 introduced the format of four duos competing as teams for the duration of the competition (as opposed to six individual contestants); this format was only used for one episode this season, but it would become more common in seasons 4 and 5 until finally becoming the show's default format in season 6. Other special formats introduced in season 3 included a four stunt show, all female contestants (in a non-celebrity episode), all gross stunts, Las Vegas Fear Factor, Miss USA Fear Factor, and a Christmas themed episode. This was the final season to conclude with a Tournament of Champions, which featured all of the season's non-celebrity winners returning to compete for a $100,000 grand prize.

Season 4 (2003–04)
The fourth season of Fear Factor saw an increasing number of special episode formats, some of which had been introduced in the previous season (e.g., four stunt, all-female, Miss USA). Although six individual contestants remained the default format, the teams format introduced in season 3 was used in five self-contained season 4 episodes. This season included three extended competitions for increased grand prizes, most notably a seven-part Couples Fear Factor series in which nine couples competed in 17 stunts for various cash and prizes, including a grand prize of one million dollars. This was also the first season where some episodes included non-elimination stunts, in which the contestant or team with the best performance won a prize, and contestants were not eliminated if they refused to attempt or failed to complete the stunt. Unlike the previous two seasons, season 4 did not include a Tournament of Champions.

Season 5 (2004–05)
The fifth season of Fear Factor continued to deviate from the show's original format, with the team format and competitions with four or more stunts becoming more prevalent. The show's introduction was revised to reflect this, stating, "Each show, contestants from around the country battle each other in extreme stunts" as opposed to "six contestants from around the country battle each other in three extreme stunts" as stated in previous seasons; the final line of the introduction was changed from "Six contestants, three stunts, one winner" to "Testing their fears, pushing their limits". Of the season's 31 episodes, 15 featured individual contestants, 9 followed the four team format, and 7 followed the extended Couples Fear Factor format established in season 4. In addition to a third-annual Las Vegas episode, this season included episodes filmed in New York City and Universal Orlando.

Season 6 (2005–06)
In its sixth season, Fear Factor abandoned the original format of six individual contestants competing for $50,000 and switched to a permanent format of four teams of two people competing for the grand prize. All episodes in Season 6 end with a Fear Factor Home Invasion: a short segment where host Joe Rogan travels to a home somewhere in America and challenges a family to compete in a stunt for a chance to win up to $5,000. The introduction segment has been eliminated and instead opens up with Joe Rogan promoting his home invasion.

Season 7 (2011–12)
After five years off the air, NBC revived Fear Factor in 2011 for a seventh season consisting of eight episodes, two of which were two-hour episodes. This was Joe Rogan's final season as host, as well as the show's final season on NBC.

NBC pulled one of the episodes (titled "Hee Haw! Hee Haw!") from the schedule due to content concerns over the second stunt, in which contestants drank donkey semen and urine. The episode aired in Denmark in June 2012, and Fear Factor eventually posted short clips of all three stunts on their YouTube channel.

Specials

MTV episodes
MTV's Fear Factor continued to follow the format of four teams competing in three challenges for a grand prize of $50,000, although MTV's format differed in some ways from the original format on NBC. This incarnation of the series was hosted by Ludacris.

Season 1 (2017)

Season 2 (2018)
The second season of MTV's Fear Factor was divided into two halves, subtitled Season From Hell and Celebrity Fear Factor. The latter featured teams of celebrity contestants (or one celebrity contestant paired with a non-celebrity friend or relative) playing for charity.

References

External links
 (NBC)
 (MTV)

Episodes
Fear Factor